Nicolas Majerus (born 15 November 1982) is a French coxswain. He won a gold medal at the 2004 World Rowing Championships in Banyoles with the lightweight men's eight.

References

1982 births
Living people
French male rowers
World Rowing Championships medalists for France
Coxswains (rowing)
21st-century French people